HMV is a British entertainment retailer.

HMV may also refer to:
 HMV Canada, a Canadian music retailer
 HMV Ireland, an Irish music retailer
 IATA code for Hemavan Airport in Sweden
 His Master's Voice, a British record label and entertainment trademark
 Hmong Dô language, spoken in Vietnam
 Heavy maintenance visit in aircraft maintenance checks
 Karia HM V, a Finnish tram